Duke Sumner Stroud (born April 14, 1938) is an American actor who has appeared on screen since the 1970s. He was married to Linda Moss and they had one son, Jason.

Early life
Stroud was born in San Diego, California on April 14, 1938. He graduated from the University of California at Berkeley.

Career
His first credited role came in 1973 when he appeared in as Jameson in an episode of Mission: Impossible. He has also appeared in TV serials including The Dukes of Hazzard, Voyagers!, The A-Team, The Outlaws, Hill Street Blues, Law & Order and Human Desires.

He also appeared in several films which include The Long Riders, Zoot Suit, Top Gun and most recently Beautiful Dreamer.  He also played Vince McKinnon on NBC's daytime soap opera Another World.

Filmography

Film

Television

References

External links

1938 births
Living people
American male television actors
American male film actors
20th-century American male actors
21st-century American male actors
Male actors from San Diego
University of California, Berkeley alumni